Keating may refer to:

People
 Keating (surname)
 Paul Keating, former Australian Prime Minister

Places

Canada
 Keating Channel, a waterway in Toronto, Ontario

United States
 Keating, Oregon, an unincorporated community
 Keating, Pennsylvania, an unincorporated community
 Keating Summit, Pennsylvania, an unincorporated community
 East Keating Township, Pennsylvania
 Keating Township, McKean County, Pennsylvania
 Keating Township, Potter County, Pennsylvania
 West Keating Township, Pennsylvania

Fictional characters
Analise Keating, played by Viola Davis, fictional defense lawyer and law professor in How to Get Away With Murder
Dr. Hannah Keating, Analise's sister-in-law, in How to Get Away With Murder, played by Marcia Gay Harden
Sam Keating, Analise's husband in How to Get Away With Murder, played by Tom Verica
Keating 5, Analise Keating's interns, in How to Get Away With Murder (season 1):
Laurel Castillo, played by Karla Souza
Wes Gibbins, played by Alfred Enoch
Asher Millstone, played by Matt McGorry
Michaela Pratt, played by Aja Naomi King
Connor Walsh, played by Jack Falahee

Other uses
Keating!, a musical about Paul Keating
Charles V. Keating Millennium Centre, Antigonish, Nova Scotia, Canada
Keating Five, the collective name for five senators: Alan Cranston, Dennis DeConcini, John Glenn, John McCain, and Donald W. Riegle, Jr.
 Keating Model, potential between atoms
Keating Natatorium, St. Xavier High School, Cincinnati, Ohio, US
 Keating TKR (Keating Supercars), a British automaker